Jimmy Mitchell (22 October 1924 – 11 March 2004) was a Scottish footballer, who played for Queen's Park, Morton, Aberdeen and was player/manager of Cowdenbeath. Mitchell also represented the Scottish League XI once.

References

1924 births
2004 deaths
Footballers from Glasgow
Scottish footballers
Association football fullbacks
Queen's Park F.C. players
Greenock Morton F.C. players
Aberdeen F.C. players
Cowdenbeath F.C. players
Scottish Football League players
Scottish Football League representative players
Scottish football managers
Cowdenbeath F.C. managers
Scottish Football League managers
Association football player-managers